The 2003 Asian Archery Championships was the 13th edition of the event. It was held in Yangon, Myanmar from 4 to 9 November 2003 and was organized by Asian Archery Federation.

Medal summary

Recurve

Compound

Medal table

References

 Results

Asian Championship
A
Asian Archery Championships
Archery competitions in Myanmar